Pyrgulopsis blainica, is a species of minute freshwater snails with an operculum, aquatic gastropod molluscs or micromolluscs in the family Hydrobiidae.

This species is endemic to Blaine Spring near Varney, Montana, United States.  Its natural habitat is springs.

Description
Its differentiated from other Pyrgulopsis in that its penial filament has a small lobe and large filament with the penial ornament consisting of a small terminal gland, a gland along the outer edge of the penial lobe and a ventral gland.

References

 

Molluscs of the United States
blainica
Gastropods described in 2008